Anne Byrne may refer to:

 Anne Frances Byrne (1775–1837), member of the Water-Colour Society
 Anne Byrne (actress) (born 1943), American actress
 Anne Byrne (singer), Irish singer
 Anne Hamilton-Byrne, leader of The Family, a controversial Australian New Age organization
 Anne-Marie Byrne, Lady Byrne, fictional character in the BBC medical drama Holby City

See also
 Ann Burns (disambiguation)
 Byrne (surname)